The Eden Hotel also known as El Eden and The Eden is a former hotel and historic site located in La Falda, Argentina, in 45 km from Cabildo de Córdoba, one of the oldest colonial buildings still standing in South America.

History
The hotel was built in 1897 by German army officer Roberto Bahlcke. Its main shareholders were Ernesto Tornquist, Juan Kurth, Roberto Bahlcke and María Herbert de Kraeutner.

Over the years, the results were not as expected, and in 1905 the shareholders unanimously decided the dissolution and liquidation of the company. It subsequently passed into the hands of Walter and Ida Eichorn, Germans with strong ties to the German expatriate community in Argentina and supporters of Adolf Hitler and the Nazi Party. The Argentine government seized the hotel following the nation's March 1945 declaration of war against Germany.  The government cited the hotel as representing enemy property.

Successive efforts to operate and revitalize the hotel continued through the 1960s, at which point the property finally ceased to house guests. In subsequent years the vacant property was repeatedly vandalized. The hotel closed in 1965 and never again received guests. Plans to turn it into a casino eventually collided with the historical and architectural importance of the building, and it was declared Historical Monument in 1988. In recent years the hotel has been partially restored and reopened by the local municipal authority as a tourist destination.

Notable guests
Notable guests that frequented the hotel include families of the Argentine aristocracy such as the Martinez de Hoz, Tornquist, Bianchi, Roca, Bunge, Anchorena, Blaquier, and Peralta Ramos.

Other famous guests include:
 Nicaraguan poet Rubén Darío
 scientist Albert Einstein
 Berta Singerman 
 Hugo del Carril
 Arturo Toscanini Italian conductor

In popular culture 
A conspiracy theory, propagated by the History Channel in its series Hunting Hitler, is that Adolf Hitler visited La Falda and stayed at the home of the owners of the Eden Hotel for a short time during his travels throughout South America after World War Two.

References

Hotels in Argentina